[[File:Madonna in trono con santi Sebastiano e Vincenzo Ferer.jpg|thumb|300px|Madonna and Child with Saint Sebastian and Saint Vincent Ferrer (1506) by Andrea Previtali]]Madonna and Child with Saint Sebastian and Saint Vincent Ferrer or Madonna and Child with Saint Sebastian and Saint Thomas Aquinas''' oil on panel painting by Andrea Previtali. It was produced in 1506 in Venice while he was still in the studio of Giovanni Bellini and is contemporary with the same artist's Madonna and Child (Museum of Fine Arts (Budapest)). It is now in the Accademia Carrara in Bergamo, to which it passed from Guglielmo Lochis's collection in 1866. 

The saint on the right is not definitively identified and lacks the traditional attributes of either St Thomas Aquinas or St Vincent Ferrer. The work is signed ANDREAS, NERGOMENSIS. DISSIPULUS IOVA.BELINI.P.XIT and dated MCCCCCVI, both on the base of the Madonna's marble throne. The signature is followed by a palm branch and an olive branch bound by a ribbon, a symbol which also appears on the artist's St John the Baptist with Four Saints (church of Santo Spirito, Bergamo), the picture cycle for palazzo Zogna and Christ Blessing (National Gallery, London). Also on the throne's base is a symbol, possibly YHS (the trigram of Bernardino of Siena) or more likely VHS (Virgini Hominum Servatrici or To the Virgin, Servant of Mankind'').

References

Bibliography
 
 
 

Paintings by Andrea Previtali
Collections of the Accademia Carrara
Paintings of the Madonna and Child
Paintings of Saint Sebastian
Paintings of Vincent Ferrer
Paintings of Thomas Aquinas
1506 paintings